Güzelöz may refer to:

 Güzelöz, Ağaçören, village in Aksaray Province, Turkey
 Güzelöz, Nallıhan, village in Ankara Province, Turkey
 Güzelöz, Gercüş, in Batman Province, Turkey
  aka Mavrucan, in Yeşilhisar Province, Turkey